Mary Ann Maitland (Davidson; 26 January 1839 — 24 February 1919) was a Scottish-born Canadian author of poems, hymns, and short stories. The "Ann" character in Maitland's short story, "Charity Ann: Founded on Facts" (Godey's Lady's Book, January 1892), provided the background for Anne Shirley's history and adoption in Anne of Green Gables.

Early life
Mary Ann Davidson was born in Elgin, Moray, Scotland, 26 January 1839. She is a daughter of James Alexander Davidson, the first teacher in the Infant School of Elgin, and Elizabeth Wilson Maitland. She was a maternal granddaughter of the Provost Wilson of that town. Maitland came to Canada with her father in 1857, when she was 18 years of age. She had, before leaving Scotland, written some creditable verses, but it was not until she came to Canada that her merits as a poet were fully acknowledged.

Career
In a short time, her contributions found their way into the S.S. Times, The New York Observer, Christian at Work, Godey's Lady's Book, Gems of Poetry, Woman's Magazine, and other standard American periodicals. Maitland's own estimate of her poems was:— "I am well aware that they contain no high poetic flight or lofty imagery; perhaps their only merit is their tenderness." A writer in Daughters of America who was familiar with Maitland and her writings, said of her that she is "one of the sweetest singers of the day," and the Idea said in a sketch of her:— "Mrs. Maitland is by nature a poet — one in whom the most natural form of expression is in rhyme and rhythm".

She married George Forbes Maitland (1835-1928), photographer, in Hamilton, Ontario on 4 February 1861, and they moved to Stratford, Ontario. After the death of a son, Maitland became depressed, which not only affected her health but her writing as well, with many of her poems, after the death, being tinged with sadness. Her poems were collected and prepared for publication. A number of hymns written by Maitland were set to music.

Personal life
Maitland and her husband had six children including, William James, Minnie Margaret, Marianne, Isabella "Belle" McDonald, Eleanor Lillian "Nellie", and George Herrie. She lived in Elgin, Scotland (1839-1857); Hamilton, Ontario (1861-1864); St. Catharines, Ontario (c1865-c1874); Buffalo, New York and New York City; Stratford, Ontario (1877, 1881, 1891, 1911); and St. Marys, Ontario (-1919). Her religion was Baptist. She died 24 February 1919 at St. Marys, Ontario, at the age of 80.

Selected works
Autumn Leaves, 1907
 God Speed the True: a Little Volume of Cheerful Canadian Verse, 1919
Keep a light in the window burning (hymn)
Today the saints in Zion are watching (hymn)

References

Attribution

Bibliography

External links
 

19th-century Canadian short story writers
19th-century Canadian women writers
20th-century Canadian short story writers
20th-century Canadian women writers
People from Elgin, Moray
Canadian women poets
Canadian hymnwriters
1919 deaths
1839 births
Canadian women short story writers
19th-century Canadian poets
20th-century Canadian poets
Scottish emigrants to Canada
Women hymnwriters